Lucelle Abbey or Lützel Abbey was a Cistercian monastery in the present village of Lucelle, in the Haut-Rhin department in Alsace, France, but located right on the Swiss border.

The name of the original foundation was Lucis cella, the "cell of light".

Lucelle was founded in 1124 as a daughter house of Bellevaux Abbey, which in its turn was a daughter house of Morimond Abbey. It was dissolved in 1792 during the French Revolution.

Daughter houses
The following were daughter houses settled from Lucelle:
 Neubourg Abbey (1130/1131)
 Kaisheim Abbey (1133)
 Lieu-Croissant Abbey (1134)
 Salem Abbey (1134/1137 or 1138)
 Frienisberg Abbey (1131/1138)
 Pairis Abbey (1139)
 St. Urban's Abbey (1194)

Lützel Abbey seems also to have founded a small Cistercian nunnery, Kleinlützel Priory in Switzerland, in about 1136–1138, although there is no direct evidence that they did so or that the women's community at Kleinlützel was Cistercian. In 1264 the foundation was given to the Augustinian Canons of Basle. Lützel Abbey regained possession of the premises at the beginning of the 16th century.

External links

  History of Lucelle/Lützel

Cistercian monasteries in France
Buildings and structures in Haut-Rhin
1124 establishments in Europe
1120s establishments in France
Religious organizations established in the 1120s
Christian monasteries established in the 12th century